Don't Try may refer to:

 Don't Try (Built to Spill song)
 Don't Try (Everything Everything song)